Complementation refers to a genetic process, when two strains of an organism with different homozygous recessive mutations that produce the same mutant phenotype (for example, a change in wing structure in flies) have offspring that express the wild-type phenotype when mated or crossed. Complementation will ordinarily occur if the mutations are in different genes (intergenic complementation). Complementation may also occur if the two mutations are at different sites within the same gene (intragenic complementation), but this effect is usually weaker than that of intergenic complementation. In the case where the mutations are in different genes, each strain's genome supplies the wild-type allele to "complement" the mutated allele of the other strain's genome. Since the mutations are recessive, the offspring will display the wild-type phenotype. A complementation test (sometimes called a "cis-trans" test) can be used to test whether the mutations in two strains are in different genes. Complementation is usually weaker or absent if the mutations are in the same gene. The convenience and essence of this test is that the mutations that produce a phenotype can be assigned to different genes without the exact knowledge of what the gene product is doing on a molecular level.  The complementation test was developed by American geneticist Edward B. Lewis.

If the combination of two genomes containing different recessive mutations yields a mutant phenotype, then there are three possibilities:
 Mutations occur in the same gene.
 One mutation affects the expression of the other.
 One mutation may result in an inhibitory product.

Example of a simple complementation test

For a simple example of a complementation test, suppose a geneticist is interested in studying two strains of white-eyed flies of the species Drosophila melanogaster, more commonly known as the common fruit fly. In this species, wild type flies have red eyes and eye color is known to be related to two genes, A and B. Each one of these genes has two alleles, a dominant one that codes for a working protein (A and B respectively) and a recessive one that codes  for a malfunctioning protein (a and b respectively). Since both proteins are necessary for the synthesis of red pigmentation in the eyes, if a given fly is homozygous for either a or b, it will have white eyes.

Knowing this, the geneticist may perform a complementation test on two separately obtained strains of pure-breeding white-eyed flies. The test is performed by crossing two flies, one from each strain.  If the resulting progeny have red eyes, the two strains are said to complement; if the progeny have white eyes, they do not.

If the strains complement, we imagine that one strain must have a genotype aa BB and the other AA bb, which when crossed yield the genotype AaBb.  In other words, each strain is homozygous for a different deficiency that produces the same phenotype.  If the strains do not complement, they both must have genotypes 'aaBB', 'AAbb', or 'aabb'.  In other words, they are both homozygous for the same deficiency, which obviously will produce the same phenotype.

Complementation tests in fungi and bacteriophage

Complementation tests can also be carried out with haploid eukaryotes such as fungi, with bacteria and with viruses such as bacteriophage.  Research on the fungus Neurospora crassa led to the development of the one-gene-one-enzyme concept that provided the foundation for the subsequent development of molecular genetics. The complementation test was one of the main tools used in the early Neurospora work, because it was easy to do, and allowed the investigator to determine whether any two nutritional mutants were defective in the same, or different genes.
  
The complementation test was also used in the early development of molecular genetics when bacteriophage T4 was one of the main objects of study. In this case the test depends on mixed infections of host bacterial cells with two different bacteriophage mutant types. Its use was key to defining most of the genes of the virus, and provided the foundation for the study of such fundamental processes as DNA replication and repair, and how molecular machines are constructed.

Genetic complementation, heterosis and the evolution of sexual reproduction

Heterosis is the tendency for hybrid individuals to exceed their pure bred parents in size and vigor. The phenomenon has long been known in animals and plants. Heterosis appears to be largely due to genetic complementation, that is the masking of deleterious recessive alleles in hybrid individuals.
  
In general, the two fundamental aspects of sexual reproduction in eukaryotes are meiosis, and outcrossing. These two aspects have been proposed to have two natural selective advantages, respectively.  Meiosis is proposed to be adaptive because it facilitates recombinational repair of DNA damages that are otherwise difficult to repair. Outcrossing is proposed to be adaptive because it facilitates complementation, that is the masking of deleterious recessive alleles  (also see Heterosis).  The benefit of masking deleterious alleles has been proposed to be a major factor in the maintenance of sexual reproduction among eukaryotes.  Further, the selective advantage of complementation that arises from outcrossing may largely account for the general avoidance of inbreeding in nature (e.g. see articles Kin recognition, Inbreeding depression and Incest taboo).

Quantitative Complementation Test 
Used by Quantitative Genetics to uncover recessive mutants. Here one takes deficiencies and crosses them to a haplotype that is believed to contain the recessive mutant.

Exceptions
There are exceptions to these rules. Two non-allelic mutants may occasionally fail to complement (called "non-allelic non-complementation" or "unlinked non-complementation"). This situation is rare and is dependent on the particular nature of the mutants being tested. For example, two mutations may be synthetically dominant negative. Another exception is transvection, in which the heterozygous combination of two alleles with mutations in different parts of the gene complement each other to rescue a wild type phenotype.

Intragenic complementation

When complementation between two mutants defective in the same gene is measured, it is generally found that there is either no complementation or the complementation phenotype is intermediate between the mutant and wild-type phenotypes. Intragenic complementation (also called inter-allelic complementation) has been demonstrated in many different genes in a variety of organisms including the fungi Neurospora crassa, Saccharomyces cerevisiae and Schizosaccharomyces pombe; the bacterium Salmonella typhimurium; and the virus bacteriophage T4. In several such studies, numerous mutations defective in the same gene were isolated and mapped in a linear order on the basis of recombination frequencies to form a genetic map of the gene. Separately, the mutants were tested in pairwise combinations to measure complementation. An analysis of the results from such studies led to the conclusion that intragenic complementation, in general, arises from the interaction of differently defective polypeptide monomers to form an aggregate called a “multimer.” Genes that encode multimer-forming polypeptides appear to be common. One interpretation of the data is that polypeptide monomers are often aligned in the multimer in such a way that mutant polypeptides defective at nearby sites in the genetic map tend to form a mixed multimer that functions poorly, whereas mutant polypeptides defective at distant sites tend to form a mixed multimer that functions more effectively. The intermolecular forces likely responsible for self-recognition and multimer formation were discussed by Jehle.

See also
 Blue-white screen

References

External links 

Classical genetics